Hot Dog…The Movie is a teen sex comedy ski film released in January 1984. The film went on to gross over $17 million.

Plot

The film stars Patrick Houser as Harkin Banks, a young and ambitious freestyle skier from Idaho who is determined to prove himself in a freestyle skiing competition at Squaw Valley. Along the way he teams with a pack of fun-loving incorrigibles who called themselves the "Rat Pack" (whose leader, Dan O'Callahan is played by David Naughton), picks up an Austrian nemesis named Rudi (John Patrick Reger), and enters a love triangle with a pair of blondes, a young woman named Sunny (Tracy N. Smith) and the more mature Sylvia Fonda (played by 1982 Playboy Playmate of the Year Shannon Tweed in just her second major film role). The movie ends with an extended race scene, all of the characters take part in a "Chinese Downhill" race to determine the real champion of the competition.  Prior to the Chinese downhill, Kendo Yamamoto asks "whata dafuka isa Chinese downhill?".

Cast
 David Naughton as Dan O'Callahan
 Patrick Houser as Harkin Banks
 Tracy Smith as Sunny
 John Patrick Reger as Rudolph "Rudi" Garmisch
 Frank Koppala as Squirrel Murphy
 James Saito as Kendo Yamamoto
 Shannon Tweed as Sylvia Fonda
 George Theobald as Slasher
 Mark Vance as Heinz Hartman
 Eric Watson as Fergy
 Lynn Wieland as Michelle
 Sandy Hackett as T-shirt contestant M.C.
 Crystal Smith as Motel Clerk
 Peter Vogt as Fader Black
 Robert Fuhrmann as Rick Lauter
 David Chilton as The Corrupt Ski Judge

Reception 
Janet Maslin, writing in the New York Times, gave a generally positive review, describing the film as "light and less moronic than it might have been."

References

External links
 
 
 

1984 films
Teen sex comedy films
1980s sex comedy films
1980s sports comedy films
1980s teen comedy films
American sex comedy films
American sports comedy films
American teen comedy films
American skiing films
Metro-Goldwyn-Mayer films
United Artists films
Films directed by Peter Markle
1984 comedy films
1980s English-language films
Films produced by Edward S. Feldman
1980s American films